The 1963 American Football League All-League Team was selected after the 1963 American Football League (AFL) season by AFL players, the Associated Press (AP), the Newspaper Enterprise Association (NEA), the New York Daily News (NYDN), and United Press International (UPI) to honor the league's top performers at each position.

Teams

References
 

All-League Players
American Football League All-League players